Brezove Dane is a village in the municipalities of Teslić (Republika Srpska) and Maglaj, Zenica-Doboj Canton, Federation of Bosnia and Herzegovina, Bosnia and Herzegovina.

Demographics 
According to the 2013 census, its population was 17, with none living in the Teslić part thus all in the Maglaj part..

References

Populated places in Teslić
Populated places in Maglaj